Khalaqah is a village and corresponding 'uzlah in Hamdan District of Sanaa Governorate, Yemen. The 10th-century writer al-Hamdani mentioned it in his Sifat Jazirat al-Arab, but it is absent from most other medieval and early modern historical sources.

References 

Villages in Sanaa Governorate